Iowa Field was a stadium in Iowa City, Iowa.  It hosted the University of Iowa Hawkeyes football team until they moved to Iowa Stadium (now Kinnick Stadium) in 1929.  The stadium held 30,000 people at its peak and opened in 1890.

Iowa Field was located on the east bank of the Iowa River where a parking lot currently exists across the railroad tracks from the university's Main Library. The northern third of this area was a baseball field, while the southern two-thirds consisted of the football field and stands. This strip of land was so narrow that the upper portion of the west stands stuck out over the Iowa River and the upper section of the east stands rose directly over the railroad tracks, as shown in rare photographs of that era.

References

External links
 Old Iowa Field ca. 1925 and 1927

Defunct college football venues
Iowa Hawkeyes football
American football venues in Iowa
Defunct sports venues in Iowa
Sports venues completed in 1890
Sports venues demolished in 1928
1890 establishments in Iowa
1928 disestablishments in Iowa